Skuon is the district capital of Cheung Prey District, in Kampong Cham Province, Cambodia. This busy market town has grown up around the intersection of National Highway 6 and National Highway 7. Skuon is sometimes known in the local language as "Spiderville", it is famous with international visitors to Cambodia for its fried spiders.

References 

 Freeman, Michael (2004), Cambodia, Reaktion Books, . p. 31.
 Ray, Nick (2002), Lonely Planet Cambodia, Lonely Planet Publications, . p. 308.

Towns in Cambodia
Populated places in Kampong Cham province